The 1998 Walsall Metropolitan Borough Council election took place on 7 May 1998 to elect members of Walsall Metropolitan Borough Council in the West Midlands, England. One third of the council was up for election and the council stayed under no overall control.

After the election, the composition of the council was
Labour 30
Conservative 16
Liberal Democrat 6
Independent 1
Others 7

Background
Before the election 11 Labour councillors had split from the party, forming their own group and being led by a former leader of the council Dave Church.

Election result

References

1998 English local elections
1998
1990s in the West Midlands (county)